The Two-woman competition at the IBSF World Championships 2020 was held on 21 and 22 February 2020.

Results
The first two runs were started on 21 February at 14:04. The last two runs were held on 22 February at 15:30.

References

Two-woman